San Lorenzo Axocomanitla is a municipality in Tlaxcala in south-eastern Mexico. The municipality covers an area of 4,540 km². The municipality has a total population of 5,045.

References

Municipalities of Tlaxcala